Chief White Eagle is a 1912 American short silent Western film directed by and starring Romaine Fielding with Mary Ryan. It was produced by the Lubin Manufacturing Company and distributed by the General Film Company.

Cast
 Romaine Fielding as Chief White Eagle
 Mary Ryan as Estrella
 Robyn Adair as Lt Adair
 Richard Wangermann asa The Major
 Nellie Cytron as Estrella's Mother
 George Clancey as The Ranchman

References

External links
 

1912 films
1912 Western (genre) films
1912 short films
American black-and-white films
American silent short films
Films directed by Romaine Fielding
Lubin Manufacturing Company films
Silent American Western (genre) films
1910s American films